Street Chant were a New Zealand indie rock band who were signed to Flying Nun Records.

The band formed in Auckland in late 2007 with Emily Edrosa on guitar and vocals, Billie Rogers on bass and backing vocals and Mikey Sperring on drums, originally with the name Mean Street. In 2009, Sperring left and was replaced by Alex Brown and the band changed their name to Street Chant.

In 2010, the band released their debut album Means to critical acclaim, and won the inaugural Critics Choice Prize at the 2010 New Zealand Music Awards. In 2011, Means was shortlisted for the Taite Music Prize, and nominated for "Best Alternative Album" at the 2011 New Zealand Music Awards

In 2011, Street Chant opened for The Lemonheads in their "It's a Shame About Ray" 20th anniversary American tour.

In 2012, the band released the double A-side 7" single "Frail Girls" / "Salad Daze".

In 2013, Street Chant released a 5 track cassette/free download EP called Isthmus of One Thousand Lovers.

In late 2013, Street Chant performed a New Zealand tour as backing band for David Saunders of the 90's Flying Nun Records band The 3D's, performing a selection of 3Ds songs and covers.

In early 2015, it was announced that Alex Brown had left the band, and was replaced by Christopher Varnham of Auckland post-punk band Wilberforces.

Street Chant released their second album "Hauora" in 2016 to critical acclaim. Pedestrian Support League was nominated for the 2016 Silver Scroll. Hauora won the prestigious Taite Music Prize in 2017.

As of 2020, Street Chant are no longer together. Emily releases music under Emily Edrosa.

Discography

Albums

EPs

Singles

Music videos

Awards and nominations 

|-
| 2010
| Means
| New Zealand Music Awards - Critics' Choice Prize
| 
|-
| rowspan="2" | 2011
| Means
| New Zealand Music Awards - Best Alternative Album
| 
|-
| Means
| Taite Music Prize
| 
|-
| 2016
| "Pedestrian Support League"
| Silver Scroll Award
| 
|}

References

External links 
 Street Chant at Arch Hill Recordings
 Street Chant at Tumblr

New Zealand indie rock groups